Meganck is a surname. Notable people with the surname include:
 Glenn Meganck, American novelist and composer
 Renier Meganck (baptised 1637–1690), Flemish painter and printmaker
  (born 1968), Belgian athletics competitor
  (1807–1891), Belgian painter
  (born 1958), Belgian athletics competitor